Elvira Rinatovna Ziyastinova (born 13 February 1991) is a Russian footballer who plays for FC Minsk on loan from Lokomotiv Moscow and the Russia national team.

She played for Russia at UEFA Women's Euro 2017.

References

External links
 

1991 births
Living people
Russian women's footballers
Russia women's international footballers
Women's association football defenders
Universiade medalists in football
Universiade bronze medalists for Russia
FC Zorky Krasnogorsk (women) players
WFC Rossiyanka players
WFC Lokomotiv Moscow players
ZFK CSKA Moscow players
Tatar people
Sportspeople from Izhevsk
Russian Women's Football Championship players
UEFA Women's Euro 2017 players
21st-century Russian women